Russell George Alexander "Russ, Dubbie" Bowie (August 24, 1880 – April 8, 1959) was a Canadian ice hockey player. He was generally regarded as one of the best players of the pre-NHL era of the sport, and was inducted into the Hockey Hall of Fame in 1947. A staunch amateur, he retired from playing in 1909 when all major hockey leagues turned professional, though he continued as an on-ice official until an injury forced his retirement. In nine seasons of competitive play, he led his league in goal scoring five times.

Playing career
Bowie played centre and rover for numerous amateur Montreal teams in the 1890s. His senior debut came in 1899 with the Montreal Victorias, who were playing in the Canadian Amateur Hockey League (CAHL). He would finish with 11 goals in 7 league games, the third best in the league. Throughout his career he was a five-time scoring champion and scored an unprecedented 234 goals in 80 recorded league games. Bowie played for the Victorias when they won the Stanley Cup for the final time, in 1898. An accomplished stickhandler who credited his skill to employing an unusually short stick, he was cited in many all-star lists as one of the very best forwards of hockey's first half-century.

On February 20, 1901, Bowie of the Montreal Victorias scored seven goals in a game and was well positioned to dominate the CAHL, and two weeks later, he scored 6 goals against the Montreal Shamrocks. He finished the season with 24 goals, 14 more than his nearest rival. 

In the 1903 season Bowie led the CAHL in scoring with 22 goals in 7 games. He repeated as CAHL scoring leader in 1904 with 27 goals in 8 games. His 26 goals in 8 games led the CAHL for a third year in a row in 1905. The CAHL was replaced by the Eastern Canada Amateur Hockey Association for 1906, and during the season Bowie missed one game and finished second in scoring with 30 goals in 9 games, one behind leader Harry Smith. He placed second again in 1907 with 38 goals in 10 games.

Over his career, Bowie would average almost three goals per game, a mark only matched by Frank McGee in major senior play. He again led the league in scoring in 1903, with 22 goals in 7 games, 8 ahead of McGee.

Bowie never accepted money to play hockey, famously refusing all importuning and turning down large offers, and was quoted as saying, "I am an amateur, was an amateur, and will die an amateur." He weathered a scandal in 1907 where it was alleged that he had taken pay from the professional Montreal Wanderers club, but the allegations were proven false—although the Wanderers did send him a grand piano in anticipation of Bowie's acceptance of their offer, an inducement he refused to receive. He did play against professionals in the ECAHA and IPHL.

Bowie retired from major play in 1909 — along with Harvey Pulford, Harry Westwick and Alf Smith, one of the final players who had played in the 19th century — when the professional National Hockey Association formed and the Victorias faded from major hockey prominence. He played in ten games for the Victorias in the next two seasons in lower level amateur competition, but his retirement was punctuated by an injury in 1910, when he broke his collarbone. He became a referee in retirement, officiating for the NHA thereafter.

He led the league in scoring in 1901, 1903, 1904, 1905, and 1908.

He was inducted into the Hockey Hall of Fame in 1947.

Career statistics

Regular season and playoffs

References

Bibliography

External links
 

1880 births
1959 deaths
Anglophone Quebec people
Canadian ice hockey centres
Montreal Victorias players
Hockey Hall of Fame inductees
Ice hockey people from Montreal
Stanley Cup champions